Remember, I Love You is Taiwanese Mandopop artist Vic Chou's, of boy band F4, second Mandarin studio album. It was released on 2 January 2003 by Sony Music Taiwan. A second limited edition was released on 10 February 2003

The album was awarded one of the Top 10 Selling Mandarin Albums of the Year at the 2004 IFPI Hong Kong Album Sales Awards, presented by the Hong Kong branch of IFPI.

Track listing
Remember, I Love You - 記得我愛你 (pinyin: Jì Dé Wǒ Ài Nǐ) (4:24)
Your Body Temperature - 你的體温 (pinyin: Nǐ De Tī Wēn) (4:28)
Try To Love Me For A Day - 試著愛我一天 (pinyin: Shì Zhù Ài Wǒ Yì Tiān) (4:04)
Mama Said - 媽媽説 (pinyin: Mā Mā Shuì) (3:23)
How To Forget - 怎麽忘 (pinyin: Zěn Me Wàng) (5:27)
Guarantee Of Happiness - 幸福的保證 (pinyin: Xìng Fú De Bǎo Zhèng) (4:31)
Why Didn't You Come - 為何你不来 (pinyin: Wéi Hé Nǐ Bú Lái) (4:22)
Suddenly - 忽然 (pinyin: Hū Rán) (5:03)
Message Of Three Thousand Years - 三千年的留言 (pinyin: Sān Qiān Nián De Liú Yán) (4:39)
I Breathe You - 我呼吸你 (pinyin: Wǒ Hū Xī Nǐ) (4:54)

References

External links
  Chou Vic Chou discography@ Sony Music Taiwan

2004 albums
Vic Chou albums
Sony Music Taiwan albums